Pindi are decked stones or tree stumps viewed in Hinduism as abstract manifestations of the mother goddess Shakti. Most of the 20th-century goddess temples in Himachal Pradesh, India, enshrine a pindi.

See also
 Lingam

References

Hindu iconography
Religion in Himachal Pradesh
Shaktism